Conor Leahy (born 16 April 1999) is an Australian road and track cyclist, who currently rides for UCI Continental team . He became a double Commonwealth medalist at the 2022 Commonwealth Games in Birmingham, where he claimed bronze in both the individual and team pursuits.

Major results

Track

2017
 Oceanian Championships
3rd  Individual pursuit
3rd  Team pursuit
 3rd Madison, National Championships
2018
 Oceanian Championships
1st  Individual pursuit
3rd  Madison
 National Championships
2nd Kilometer
3rd Team pursuit
2019
 Oceanian Championships
1st  Individual pursuit
1st  Team pursuit
 2nd Madison, National Championships
 UCI World Cup
3rd  Team pursuit, Hong Kong
2020
 National Championships
1st  Individual pursuit
1st  Omnium
3rd Points race
2021
 1st  Individual pursuit, National Championships
2022
 Oceanian Championships
1st  Madison
1st  Team pursuit
2nd  Individual pursuit
 National Championships
1st  Individual pursuit
1st  Madison (with Josh Duffy)
 1st Team pursuit – Milton, UCI Nations Cup
 Commonwealth Games
3rd  Individual pursuit
3rd  Team pursuit

Road
2021
 2nd Time trial, National Under-23 Road Championships
2022
 3rd Time trial, National Road Championships
 4th Time trial, Oceanian Road Championships

References

External links
 

1999 births
Living people
Australian male cyclists
Australian track cyclists
20th-century Australian people
21st-century Australian people
Cyclists at the 2022 Commonwealth Games
Commonwealth Games bronze medallists for Australia
Commonwealth Games medallists in cycling
Medallists at the 2022 Commonwealth Games